The 1906–07 season was the fourteenth season in which Dundee competed at a Scottish national level, playing in Division One, where they would finish in 2nd place, 7 points behind champions Celtic. Dundee would also compete in the Scottish Cup, where they would lose to Renton in the second round.

Scottish Division One 

Statistics provided by Dee Archive

League table

Scottish Cup 

Statistics provided by Dee Archive

Player Statistics 
Statistics provided by Dee Archive

|}

See also 

 List of Dundee F.C. seasons

References 

 

Dundee F.C. seasons
Dundee